The Flemish Art Collection (Dutch: Vlaamse kunstcollectie) is a consortium or partnership between three museums in Flanders, Belgium: the Royal Museum of Fine Arts Antwerp, the Groeningemuseum in Bruges, and the Museum of Fine Arts, Ghent.

The Groeningemuseum specialises in the 15th and 16th century Early Netherlandish period and contains a number of works by Jan van Eyck, Dirk Bouts, Gerard David and Hieronymus Bosch, the Royal Museum of Fine Arts in the baroque, including works by Peter Paul Rubens and Anthony van Dyck while the Museum of Fine Arts, Ghent focuses on 19th century art, including of Théodore Géricault, Gustave Courbet and Auguste Rodin.

The body is responsible for publishing the comprehensive website / database vlaamseprimitieven, which, since 2011, catalogs writings and images related to the Flemish Primitives.

References

External links
 Official Site
 Flemish Primitives website

Art museums and galleries in Belgium